On 23 January 2016, the Democratic Left Alliance (SLD) held a leadership election, after the ex-President Leszek Miller resigned due to the election defeat in October 2015. Włodzimierz Czarzasty, who received 62.45%, was elected as the new President of the party.

Candidate 
 Włodzimierz Czarzasty - former member of the National Council of Radio Broadcasting and Television
 Jerzy Wenderlich - former member of Sejm

Result

References 

Democratic Left Alliance
Political party leadership elections in Poland
Democratic Left Alliance leadership election